Asta Helena Trolle (née unmarried Kallenbäck; born 26 November 1944 in Risinge, Sweden) is a Swedish actress. She has been married to Stig Olin. In 1989 she received a Guldmasken.

Selected filmography
1972 – Kvartetten som sprängdes (TV)
1981 – Babels hus (TV)
1989 – Tre kärlekar (TV)
1994 – Läckan (TV)
1994 – Kan du vissla Johanna?
1994 – Snoken (TV)
1996 – Tre Kronor (TV series)
2000 – Vita hästen (TV)
2000 – Låt stå! (TV)
2009 – Wallander – Prästen

References

External links
Helena Kallenbäck on Swedish Film Database
Official website
Helena Kallenbäck on Internet Movie Database

Swedish actresses
Living people
1944 births